Ross Van Ness is an unincorporated community in Chicot County, Arkansas, United States. 

Ross Van Ness is served by the Ross Van Ness Fire Department, Headquartered at 103 Stephenson Lane, Eudora, AR with additional fire stations located at 6737 HWY 159 South and 2500 HWY 8 West. For additional information and community resources visit www.rvnfire.com 

The Bob White Memorial Foundation is located within the Ross Van Ness Community and provides essential funds for Public Safety, Education and Medical projects in Southern Chicot County.

It is served by the Lakeside School District. On July 1, 1985, the Ross Van Ness School District consolidated into the Eudora School District. On February 13, 2006, the Eudora district consolidated into the Lakeside School District.

References

Unincorporated communities in Chicot County, Arkansas
Unincorporated communities in Arkansas